Dracontomyia riveti is a species of tephritid or fruit flies in the genus Dracontomyia of the family Tephritidae.

Distribution
Ecuador.

References

Tephritinae
Insects described in 1919
Taxa named by Theodor Becker
Diptera of South America